Anton Johannes Collin (12 October 1891 – 31 May 1973) was a Finnish cross country skier and road cyclist. He won the 50 km event at the 1922 Holmenkollen ski festival, becoming the first non-Norwegian to win at Holmenkollen. At the 1924 Winter Olympics he placed 16th over 18 km, and failed to finish his 50 km race. He also abandoned his 188 km cycling race at the 1924 Summer Olympics.

Cross-country skiing results

Olympic Games

World Championships

References

External links

Holmenkollen winners since 1892 – click Vinnere for downloadable pdf file 
Picture of Anton Collin and Matti Raivo 

1891 births
1973 deaths
People from Keuruu
People from Vaasa Province (Grand Duchy of Finland)
Finnish male cross-country skiers
Olympic cross-country skiers of Finland
Cross-country skiers at the 1924 Winter Olympics
Holmenkollen Ski Festival winners
Finnish male cyclists
Olympic cyclists of Finland
Cyclists at the 1924 Summer Olympics
Sportspeople from Central Finland
20th-century Finnish people